The La Grange Historic District is a national historic district located at La Grange, Lenoir County, North Carolina, United States. The district, encompassing 225 buildings and 1 structure, includes the historic commercial, residential, and industrial center of La Grange.  The buildings include notable examples of Queen Anne and Bungalow/American Craftsman style architecture and date between the 1850s and the 1930s.  Located in the district is the separately listed La Grange Presbyterian Church.  Other notable buildings include the Sutton-Kinsey House (c. 1898), Walter Pace House (c. 1900), Sutton-Fields House (c. 1850), Colonel A. C. Davis House (1887), Rouse Banking Company Building (1908), LaGrange Elementary School, and the Hardy-Newsome Industrial Complex.

It was added to the National Register of Historic Places in May 2000.

See also
 National Register of Historic Places listings in Lenoir County, North Carolina

References

2000 establishments in North Carolina
Buildings and structures in Lenoir County, North Carolina
National Register of Historic Places in Lenoir County, North Carolina
Historic districts on the National Register of Historic Places in North Carolina